Bruse Lee Marvin Gaye is the third studio album by Milk Cult, released in 1995 by ZK Records.

Track listing

Personnel
Adapted from the Bruse Lee Marvin Gaye liner notes.

Milk Cult
 Dale Flattum (as C.C. Nova) – bass guitar, tape, turntables
 Eric Holland (as Conko) – electronics
 Mike Morasky (as The Bumblebee) – tape, turntables

Additional musicians
 Mami Fukuya – vocals (5), violin (10)
 Hidekazu Miyahara – vocals (2, 6), sampler (4), guitar (8)
 Masaya Nakahara – synthesizer (1, 2, 4, 7–10), vocals (6)
 Sheeba – bass guitar (2, 9, 10), vocals (6)
 Pop Suzuki – drums (1, 9)
 Hideki Yoshimura – guitar (1, 4, 6, 8, 9), knobs (2), vocals (10)

Release history

References

External links 
 Bruse Lee Marvin Gaye at Discogs (list of releases)

1995 albums
Milk Cult albums